The 2014 Copa de México de Naciones is the 3rd edition of the Copa México de Naciones Sub-16 and it took place in the city of Mexico from August 2 to August 10, organized by the FEF (Federacion Mexicana de Futbol Asociacion AC). The previous two cups (2012 Copa de México de Naciones, 2013 Copa de México de Naciones) were both Sub-15.

For this edition all players must be born on January 1, 1998, or after.

Participating teams
Sixteen participants were invited from AFC, CONCACAF, CONMBOL and UEFA (two from Mexico).

 
 
 
 
 
 
 
 
 
 
  (2 teams)
 
 
 
 

Originally,  was slated to participate, but because of the death of Julio Grondona, head of the Asociacion del Futbol Argentino, they were forced to cancel their involvement

Group stage

Group A
  9pts
  6pts
  3pts
  0pts

Group B
  9pts
  4pts
 #2 3pts
  1pt

Group C
  9pts
  6pts
  3pts
  0pts

Group D
  9pts
  6pts
  3pts
  0pts

Semi finals
  2 vs 1 
  5 vs 4

Finals
  vs , Estadio Azteca, August 10, 2014.

References

Under-16 association football
2013–14 in Mexican football
International association football competitions hosted by Mexico
2014 in youth association football